Jamaica was one of twenty-eight nations that competed at the 1968 Summer Paralympics in Tel Aviv, Israel from November 4 to 13, 1968. The team finished fourteenth in the medal table and won a total of five medals; three gold, one silver and one bronze. Eleven athletes represented Jamaica at the Games; seven men and four women.

History

Jamaica made their Paralympic Games debut at these Games.

Archery

Seven Jamaican archers competed at the Games, none won a medal. The best result was achieved by Quida White who placed fifth in the St. Nicholas round for paraplegic women; Lewis finished eleventh in the same event.

Athletics

Seven of Jamaica's competitors took part in athletics. Two medals were won by Jamaican athletes, both gold and both in the precision javelin. Excell took the men's title, with a score of 74, and Baracatt the women's, with a score of 78.

Dartchery

The only dartchery event at the Games was the mixed pairs event which took a knockout format. Two Jamaican pairs entered; Excell and Hall lost in the first round to the eventual gold medallists from the United States; Long and Baracatt also lost in the first round to British pair Nicholson and Taylor.

Swimming

Three Jamaican swimmers competed at the Games. Patrick Reid took part in two men's class 2 complete classification events but failed to advance past the heats in either. Octavius Morgan competed in three men's class 4 incomplete classification events and achieved a best finish of fifth in the breaststroke. Jamaica's two swimming medals were both won by Meikle; she won gold in the women's 50 m breaststroke class 4 incomplete 
and silver in the 50 m freestyle.

Table tennis

Five Jamaica players took part in table tennis singles events and a pair in the women's doubles. All of the singles players were eliminated at the round of 16 stage. In the women's doubles C event Baracatt and Lewis reached the quarter-finals before losing to Great Britain's Bryant and Barnard, who went on to win the gold medal.

Weightlifting

One athlete entered a weightlifting event for Jamaica. Hall won the bronze medal in the men's lightweight with a lift of 110 kg; the gold was won by Johnsen of Norway with a new world record lift of 150 kg.

See also
Jamaica at the 1968 Summer Olympics

Notes

References

Nations at the 1968 Summer Paralympics
1968
Paralympics